Mission to Mir is a 1997 documentary film about the Mir Space Station.

Filming

Footage seen within the movie was compiled from multiple sources.  These include IMAX cameras taken into space on the Space Shuttle.  IMAX cameras were taken to the Mir Space Station on Space Shuttle missions: STS-63, STS-71, STS-74 and STS-79.  The main subject of the film were Mir missions: Mir EO-18, Mir EO-19, Mir EO-20, Mir EO-21 and Mir EO-22.

Narration 

American Space Shuttle astronaut Shannon Lucid is the dominant figure in this documentary. Her delayed return to Earth by about six weeks brought her total time in near-Earth orbit to 188 days. She talks about working, sleeping, eating, exercising and relaxing in space. She also articulates her philosophy of dealing with any and all difficulties one day at a time and always cultivating a healthy sense of humor.

See also
 Shuttle–Mir Program
 List of films featuring space stations

Notes

External links
 
 

1997 films
1997 documentary films
IMAX short films
Documentary films about outer space
IMAX documentary films
Films scored by Maribeth Solomon
Films scored by Micky Erbe
Mir
Films shot in space
1990s English-language films